The Fos Williams Medal has been awarded since 1981 to the best Australian rules football  player from South Australia during Inter-State or Inter-Competition matches. The medal is named in honour of legendary South Australian National Football League (SANFL) player and coach Fos Williams.

Originally the award was made in respect of State of Origin matches. Since that competition folded in 1999, the medal has been awarded during games where the SANFL plays other state competitions in State League representative matches (e.g. WAFL v SANFL).  The award is usually voted on by a panel selected by the SANFL from significant football identities present at the match, and may include past players, coaches and journalists.

Medal winners 
* denotes State League clash, not an AFL-level Origin match♦ South Australia played no state games in 1990 so the SANFL played a City v Country match at Football Park which was essentially an All-Stars game with teams divided into those recruited from SA's country leagues and those from Adelaide. The concept only lasted one season due to poor attendance.

|- bgcolor="#CCCCFF" 
|width="50" |  'Year
|width="140" | Fos Williams Medallist
|width="160" |  VFL/AFL/SANFL Team(s)
|width="140" |  Against
|width="120" |  Venue
|- bgcolor="#FFFFFF"
| 1981
| Peter Carey
| Glenelg
| Western Australia
| Subiaco Oval
|- bgcolor="#FFFFFF"
| 1982
| Stephen Copping
| Essendon / Glenelg
| Victoria
| Football Park
|- bgcolor="#FFFFFF"
| 1982
| Paul Weston
| Glenelg
| Western Australia
| Football Park
|- bgcolor="#FFFFFF"
| 1982
| Greg Phillips
| Port Adelaide
| Western Australia
| Subiaco Oval
|- bgcolor="#FFFFFF"
| 1983
| Michael Aish
| Norwood
| Victoria
| Football Park
|- bgcolor="#FFFFFF"
| 1983*
| Craig Williams
| West Adelaide
| Western Australia
| Subiaco Oval
|- bgcolor="#FFFFFF"
| 1984
| Stephen Kernahan
| Glenelg
| Victoria
| Football Park
|- bgcolor="#FFFFFF"
| 1984
| Garry McIntosh
| Norwood
| Western Australia
| Football Park
|- bgcolor="#FFFFFF"
| 1985
| Peter Motley
| Sturt
| Victoria
| Football Park
|- bgcolor="#FFFFFF"
| 1985
| Craig Bradley
| Port Adelaide
| Western Australia
| Subiaco Oval
|- bgcolor="#FFFFFF"
| 1986
| Craig Bradley
| Carlton / Port Adelaide
| Victoria
| Football Park
|- bgcolor="#FFFFFF"
| 1986
| Andrew Jarman
| North Adelaide
| Western Australia
| Football Park
|- bgcolor="#FFFFFF"
| 1987
| Chris McDermott
| Glenelg
| Victoria
| Football Park
|- bgcolor="#FFFFFF"
| 1987
| Andrew Jarman
| North Adelaide
| Western Australia
| Subiaco Oval
|- bgcolor="#FFFFFF"
| 1988
| Mark Mickan
| Brisbane / West Adelaide
| New South Wales
| Football Park
|- bgcolor="#FFFFFF"
| 1988
| Stephen Kernahan
| Carlton / Glenelg
| Victoria
| Football Park
|- bgcolor="#FFFFFF"
| 1988
| Michael Redden
| North Adelaide
| Western Australia
| Football Park
|- bgcolor="#FFFFFF"
| 1989
| Andrew Jarman
| North Adelaide
| Victoria
| MCG
|- bgcolor="#FFFFFF"
| 1990♦
| Andrew Jarman
| Norwood
| City v Country
| Football Park
|- bgcolor="#FFFFFF"
| 1991
| Craig Bradley
| Carlton / Port Adelaide
| Victoria 
| Football Park
|- bgcolor="#FFFFFF"
| 1991*
| Mark Naley
| South Adelaide
| WAFL
| Subiaco Oval
|- bgcolor="#FFFFFF"
| 1992
| David Hynes
| West Coast / Port Adelaide
| Victoria
| Football Park
|- bgcolor="#FFFFFF"
| 1992*
| Garry McIntosh
| Norwood
| WAFL
| Football Park
|- bgcolor="#FFFFFF"
| 1993
| Greg Anderson
| Adelaide / Port Adelaide
| Western Australia
| Football Park
|- bgcolor="#FFFFFF"
| 1993
| Craig Bradley
| Carlton / Port Adelaide
| Victoria
| MCG
|- bgcolor="#FFFFFF"
| 1993*
| Tony Lynn
| Central District
| WAFL
| WACA
|- bgcolor="#FFFFFF"
| 1994
| Andrew Jarman
| Adelaide / Norwood
| Victoria 
| Football Park
|- bgcolor="#FFFFFF"
| 1994*
| Scott Burns
| Norwood
| WAFL
| Football Park
|- bgcolor="#FFFFFF"
| 1995
| Simon Tregenza
| Adelaide / Port Adelaide
| Victoria
| MCG
|- bgcolor="#FFFFFF"
| 1995*
| Garry McIntosh
| Norwood
| Tasmania
| North Hobart Oval
|- bgcolor="#FFFFFF"
| 1996
| Tony Modra
| Adelaide / West Adelaide
| Western Australia
| Football Park
|- bgcolor="#FFFFFF"
| 1996*
| Josh Francou
| North Adelaide
| WAFL
| Subiaco Oval
|- bgcolor="#FFFFFF"
| 1997
| Brayden Lyle
| Port Adelaide
| Victoria
| Football Park
|- bgcolor="#FFFFFF"
| 1997*
| James Thiessen
| Norwood
| ACTAFL
| Manuka Oval
|- bgcolor="#FFFFFF"
| 1998
| Michael O'Loughlin
| Sydney / Central District
| Western Australia
| Football Park
|- bgcolor="#FFFFFF"
| 1998*
| Paul McCormack
| Norwood
| WAFL
| Football Park
|- bgcolor="#FFFFFF"
| 1999
| Andrew McKay
| Carlton / Glenelg
| Victoria
| MCG
|- bgcolor="#FFFFFF"
| 1999*
| Anthony Harvey
| Norwood
| VFL
| MCG
|- bgcolor="#FFFFFF"
| 2000*
| Stephen Carter
| Port Adelaide
| WAFL
| Adelaide Oval
|- bgcolor="#FFFFFF"
| 2001*
| Ben Hollands
| West Adelaide
| VFL
| Adelaide Oval
|- bgcolor="#FFFFFF"
| 2002*
| Ben Hollands
| West Adelaide
| VFL
| Adelaide Oval
|- bgcolor="#FFFFFF"
| 2003*
| Brett Backwell
| Glenelg
| WAFL
| Fremantle Oval
|- bgcolor="#FFFFFF"
| 2005*
| Scott Borlace
| Norwood
| VFL
| TEAC Oval
|- bgcolor="#FFFFFF"
| 2006*
| Daniel Schell
| Central District
| WAFL
| Adelaide Oval
|- bgcolor="#FFFFFF"
| 2008*
| Clint Alleway
| North Adelaide
| VFL
| Adelaide Oval
|- bgcolor="#FFFFFF"
| 2009*
| Jade Sheedy
| Sturt
| WAFL
| Leederville Oval
|- bgcolor="#FFFFFF"
| 2012*
| Adam Grocke
| Woodville-West Torrens
| WAFL
| Glenelg Oval
|- bgcolor="#FFFFFF"
| 2013*
| Ryan Ferguson
| West Adelaide
| NEAFL North
| Richmond Oval
|- bgcolor="#FFFFFF"
| 2014*
| Zane Kirkwood
| Sturt
| VFL
| North Port Oval
|- bgcolor="#FFFFFF"
| 2015*
| Tom Keough
| West Adelaide
| WAFL
| Lathlain Park
|- bgcolor="#FFFFFF"
| 2016*
| Zane Kirkwood
| Sturt
| VFL
| Adelaide Oval
|- bgcolor="#FFFFFF"
| 2018*
| Zane Kirkwood
| Sturt
| WAFL
| Adelaide Oval
|- bgcolor="#FFFFFF"
| 2019*
| Michael Knoll
| South Adelaide
| WAFL
| Optus Stadium
|- bgcolor="#FFFFFF"
| 2021*
| Matthew Broadbent
| South Adelaide
| WAFL
| Adelaide Oval

See also 
Interstate matches in Australian rules football
Simpson Medal – Western Australia
E. J. Whitten Medal – Victoria (State of Origin)
Frank Johnson Medal – Victoria (VFL)

References 
 FootySA Wiki
 Full Points Footy

Australian rules football awards